Lugarno is a suburb in the St George area of southern Sydney, in the state of New South Wales, Australia. It is located in the local government area of the Georges River Council, 23 kilometres south of the Sydney central business district.

Situated on the northern bank of the Georges River, Lugarno is known for its large areas of bushland. Peakhurst and Peakhurst Heights, to the north, are the only adjoining suburbs. Nearby suburbs include Alfords Point, Illawong (on the other side of the Georges River), Padstow Heights (on the other side of Salt Pan Creek) and Oatley (on the other side of Lime Kiln Bay).

History
The area now known as Lugarno lies either on the traditional lands of the Dharug people or the coastal Eora people, both of whom spoke a common language. It lies close to the lands of the Tharawal on the south bank of the river. There was an unofficial Aboriginal settlement at nearby Salt Pan Creek for many years. Georges River Council acknowledges that the Biddegal/Bidjigal/Bedegal clan of the Eora are the original inhabitants and custodians of all land and water in the Georges River region.

Lime Kiln Bay once had more extensive shell middens, made over centuries by local people, the bay gets its name from early settlers burning the shells to create lime.There was an unofficial Aboriginal settlement at nearby Salt Pan Creek for many years.

One of the earliest contacts between British settlers and Aboriginal people occurred on 20 January 1788. Arthur Philip and Philip Gidley King, leading a party of seamen from the First Fleet rowing two open boats, explored the 'South-West Arm of Botany Bay' (now Georges River). They are now thought to have gone as far as Lime Kiln Bay, where they landed at two locations there, the first of which they called 'Lance Point'—thought to be modern-day Gertrude Point, Lugarno—where an altercation with local people occurred. Later the same day, there was a peaceful meeting at the head of Lime Kiln Bay. Not finding enough freshwater, around Botany Bay and its two 'arms', the colonists moved on to Port Jackson, where the settlement of Sydney began six days later.

Lugarno was named after Lake Lugano, Switzerland by surveyors Major Sir Thomas Livingstone Mitchell (1792-1855) and William Govett (1807-1848) in 1843. An extra 'r' was added for the suburb name. Thomas Lawrence was granted  of land in 1831, on the western side of the peninsula near Salt Pan Creek.

The whole area between Arncliffe and Lugarno was originally heavily timbered. Illawarra Road was built by convicts in 1841 and it ran through Gannon's Forest, down to the Georges River. The road from Arncliffe was later known as Gannon's Forest Road and today is known as Forest Road. The name has been retained in Old Illawarra Road, over the river in Menai and Lucas Heights. 

A punt operated from Lugarno across the river from 1843. An established ferry serviced the area from 1887 to 1974, closing with the opening of the Alfords Point Bridge. The suburb was developed into mainly residential in the 1960s when land was released for home sites.

The area now known as H. V. Evatt Memorial Park lies on volcanic soil, a rarity in Sydney. It is the weathered remains of a diatreme, a type of volcanic pipe. The area was a market garden until c.1961. The pond at the north end of the park was created as an irrigation dam. After the market garden became disused, the area was threatened by housing development, until it was saved as open space and sporting fields. The natural slope of the hill was altered by excavation and levelling to create level playing fields.

According to a 2012 survey conducted by the governments of Australia and New Zealand, Lugarno has the most roundabouts per capita in the Southern Hemisphere. With a population of around 5500 and 7 roundabouts the ratio is 1:785, slightly beating out the Victorian town of Sausage Gully.

Parks and waterways
 Georges River National Park, CF Williams Reserve, HV Evatt Park, Taylors Reserve
 Georges River, Salt Pan Creek, Soily Bottom Point, Gertrude Point, Edith Bay, Boggywell Creek, Lime Kiln Bay

Churches
St Stephens Anglican Church, Lugarno-Peakhurst Uniting Church and Church of Samoa Parish of Sydney.

Commercial area
Lugarno has two small sets of shops. At Chivers Hill shops there is a newsagency, IGA supermarket, deli, chemist, a cafe, an Italian restaurant, florist, hairdressers, chicken shop, Chinese take-away, bakery and a dry cleaners. At Lime Kiln shops there is a personal training studio, dental and medical centre, dance studio, real estate agent, and Thai restaurant.

Public transport
Two revenue bus services operate out of Lugarno, both operated by Punchbowl Bus Company. The 943 service runs between Lugarno and Hurstville via Penshurst, while the 942 service operates between Lugarno and Campsie via Riverwood, Roselands, Wiley Park, Lakemba and Belmore.

Sport and recreation
Gannons Park is the home ground of 2 soccer clubs, Lugarno F.C. and Forest Rangers F.C. Evatt Park is the home ground of the St George Junior Baseball Club, Penshurst RSL Rugby League Club, and the Oatley Rugby Union Club.  The Lugarno-Peakhurst Uniting Church organises a netball competition which takes place at Olds Park, Penshurst.

Lugarno is home to the Lugarno Football Club, one of the most prominent and respected clubs in the St George Football Association. In the most recent football season the club fielded some 42 teams (20 competition and 22 non-competition teams) and had more than 500 registered players and 102 team officials covering the age groups from the under 6's to the over 45's. The Club fields teams across both genders.

Population
At the time of the 2006 census, the population of Lugarno stood at 5,707. 19.1% of census respondents stated they were born overseas with the top countries of birth being United Kingdom 3.1%, China 1.9% and Greece 1.5%. English was stated as the only language spoken at home by 76.0% of residents and the most common other languages spoken were Greek 6.3%, Arabic 2.6% and Cantonese 2.2%. The most common responses for religious affiliation were Catholic 30.2%, Anglican 22.7% and Orthodox 11.9%.

Education
Lugarno is home to only one educational institution, Lugarno Public School, which opened in 1933.

References

External links
 National Trust Lugarno Tree Study

Suburbs of Sydney
Georges River Council